The Yara-ma-yha-who is a legendary creature found in Australian Aboriginal mythology. The legend is recounted by David Unaipon. According to legend, the creature resembles a little red frog-like man with a very big head, a large mouth with no teeth and suckers on the ends of its hands and feet.

The Yara-ma-yha-who is said to live in fig trees. Instead of hunting for food, it is described as waiting for an unsuspecting traveller to rest under the tree. The creature then drops down and uses its suckers to drain the victim's blood. After that it swallows the person, drinks some water, and then takes a nap. When the Yara-ma-yha-who awakens, it regurgitates the victim, leaving them shorter than before. The victim's skin also has a reddish tint to it that it didn't have before.

According to legend, the Yara-ma-yha-who is only active during the day and only targets living prey. "Playing dead" until sunset (it is said to only hunt during the day) is offered as a ploy to avoid attack. Stories of this creature were reportedly told to misbehaving children.

See also
Vampire
Bogeyman
Drop bear
Garkain

References

External links
Yara-Ma-Yha-Who (2010) Short film on Vimeo

Australian Aboriginal legendary creatures
Australian Aboriginal words and phrases
Mythological monsters
Vampires
Mythic humanoids
Mythological hematophages
Fictional frogs